The Men's 100 Butterfly at the 10th FINA World Swimming Championships (25m) was swum 15–16 December 2010 in Dubai, United Arab Emirates. On 15 December, 92 individuals swam the Preliminary heats in the morning, with the top-16 finishers advancing to the Semifinals that evening. The top-8 finishers from the Semifinal then advanced to the Final then next evening.

At the start of the event, the existing World (WR) and Championship records (CR) were:

Results

Heats

Semifinals
Semifinal 1

Semifinal 2

Final

References

Butterfly 100 metre, Men's
World Short Course Swimming Championships